House is a surname. Notable people with the surname include:

Albert Phillip House (1890–1966), New Zealand rugby footballer
Alex House (born 1986), Canadian actor
Andrew House (born 1965), British businessman
Ashley House (TV presenter), British television presenter
Barry House (born 1949), Australian politician
Byron O. House (1902–1969), American jurist
Carolyn House (born 1945), American swimmer
Christopher House (born 1955), Canadian choreographer
Colleen House (1952–2022), American politician
Craig House (baseball) (born 1977), American baseball player
Daina House (born 1954), American model and actress
Daniel House (born 1961), American musician
Danielle House (born 1976), Canadian model
Danuel House (born 1993), American basketball player
Dave House, English singer-songwriter
Sir David House (1922–2012), British army officer
Davon House (born 1989), American football player
Douglas House (Arkansas politician) (born 1953), member of the Arkansas House of Representatives
Eddie House (born 1978), American basketball player
Edward M. House (1858–1938), American diplomat and politician
Ernest R. House (born 1937), American academic
Fred House (born 1978), American basketball player
Frederick Maurice House (1865–1936), English-born Australian naturalist
George House (disambiguation), multiple people
Gerry House (born 1948), American radio personality
Graham House (cricketer) (born 1950), Australian cricketer
Harry House (1919–2006), Australian rules footballer
Henry Alonzo House (1840–1930), American manufacturing engineer
Homer Doliver House (1878–1949), American botanist
Howard P. House (1908–2003), American otologist
Jack House (1906–1991), British writer
James House (singer) (born 1955), American musician
Jim House (1948–2018), American politician
Jeffry House (born 1946), Canadian lawyer
Jemma House (born 1996), Australian soccer player
J. R. House (born 1979), American baseball player
Julian House, British musician
Juliane House (born 1942), German linguist
Karen Elliott House, American journalist
Kevin House (born 1957), American football player
Kevin House, Jr. (born 1979), American football player
Kristian House (born 1979), English cyclist
Matilda House (activist) (born 1945), Australian activist
Mel House (born 1976), American film director
Monty House (born 1946), Australian politician
Pat House (born 1940), American baseball player
Paul D. House, Canadian chief executive
Paul R. House (born 1958), American Old Testament scholar and writer
Rachael House, British contemporary artist
Rachel House (actress) (born 1971), New Zealand actress
Richard House, British writer
Rick House (born 1957), Canadian football player
Royal Earl House (1814–1895), American communications engineer
Silas House (born 1971), American writer
Simon House (born 1948), English composer and musician
Son House (1902–1988), American musician
Stephen House (born 1957), British police officer
Steve House (born 1970), American climber
Tanner House (ice hockey) (born 1986), Canadian ice hockey player
T. J. House (born 1989), American baseball player
Ted House (born 1959), American politician and judge
Tom House (born 1947), American baseball player
Will House (cricketer) (born 1976), English cricketer
William F. House (1923–2012), American otologist
Yoanna House (born 1980), American model